Michelangelo Aliprandi (1527–1595) was an Italian painter from Verona, who also painted a fresco at the Miniscalchi Palace there. He who flourished from about 1560 to 1582.

Work
He was an imitator, if not a pupil, of Paolo Veronese, in whose style he painted  an altar-piece — the Madonna and Child between St. Roch and St. Sebastian — in the church of SS. Nazaro e Celso in Verona, where it is still preserved. Many of the works which Aliprandi painted in and around his native city are however lost.

His drawing of  Virgin and Child crowned by the angels, with St. Sebastian and St. Rock is in the Louvre.

References

External links
 Museo-Miniscalchi Website

Attribution:
 

1527 births
1595 deaths
16th-century Italian painters
Italian male painters
Italian Renaissance painters
Painters from Verona